Dane Paterson (born 4 April 1989) is a South African cricketer. He made his international debut for the South Africa cricket team in 2017. He plays for Eastern Province in domestic matches.

Domestic career
He was included in the Western Province cricket team squad for the 2015 Africa T20 Cup. In August 2017, he was named in Bloem City Blazers' squad for the first season of the T20 Global League. However, in October 2017, Cricket South Africa initially postponed the tournament until November 2018, with it being cancelled soon after.

In June 2018, he was named in the squad for the Cape Cobras team for the 2018–19 season. In September 2018, he was named in Western Province's squad for the 2018 Africa T20 Cup. He was the leading wicket-taker for Western Province in the tournament, with seven dismissals in four matches.

In October 2018, he was named in Paarl Rocks' squad for the first edition of the Mzansi Super League T20 tournament. He was the joint-leading wicket-taker for the team in the tournament, with ten dismissals in eleven matches.

In September 2019, he was named in Western Province's squad for the 2019–20 CSA Provincial T20 Cup. In April 2021, he was named in Eastern Province's squad, ahead of the 2021–22 cricket season in South Africa.

International career
In January 2017, he was included in South Africa's Twenty20 International (T20I) squad for their series against Sri Lanka, and made his T20I debut on 25 January 2017. The following month, he was included in South Africa's One Day International (ODI) squad for their series against New Zealand. In October 2017, he was named as Morné Morkel replacement for the second Test against Bangladesh. The same month, he was named in South Africa's One Day International (ODI) squad for the series against Bangladesh. He made his ODI debut for South Africa against Bangladesh on 15 October 2017.

In December 2018, he was added to South Africa's Test squad for the series against Pakistan, but he did not play. In December 2019, he was named in South Africa's Test squad for their series against England. He made his Test debut for South Africa, against England, on 16 January 2020.

References

External links
 

1989 births
Living people
Cricketers from Cape Town
South African cricketers
South Africa Test cricketers
South Africa One Day International cricketers
South Africa Twenty20 International cricketers
Western Province cricketers
Dolphins cricketers
KwaZulu-Natal cricketers
Cape Cobras cricketers
South Western Districts cricketers
Paarl Rocks cricketers
Jozi Stars cricketers
Nottinghamshire cricketers
Eastern Province cricketers